Zhang Haoran (born 6 February 1997) is a Chinese footballer currently playing as a midfielder for Wuhan Zall.

Club career
Zhang Haoran would be promoted to the senior team of Wuhan Zall in the 2019 Chinese Super League campaign and he would go on to make his debut on 1 May 2019 in a Chinese FA Cup game against Shanghai SIPG F.C. that ended in a 3–1 defeat.

Career statistics

References

External links

1997 births
Living people
Chinese footballers
Association football midfielders
Chinese Super League players
Wuhan F.C. players